Oh... Rosalinda!!  is a 1955 British musical comedy film by the British director-writer team of Michael Powell and Emeric Pressburger. The film stars Michael Redgrave, Mel Ferrer, Anthony Quayle, Ludmilla Tchérina and Anton Walbrook and features Anneliese Rothenberger and Dennis Price.

The film is based on the 1874 operetta Die Fledermaus (The Bat) by Johann Strauss, but updated to take place in post-war Vienna as occupied by the four Allied powers: the United States, the United Kingdom, France and the USSR. The music, played by the Vienna Symphony Orchestra under conductor Alois Melichar, has new lyrics by Dennis Arundell, and professional singers dubbed for some of the actors. The choreography is by Alfred Rodrigues, and the production was designed by Hein Heckroth.

Oh... Rosalinda!! is a light-hearted Technicolor romp that makes full use of the new CinemaScope process, and is not just a film of a staged production but a filmic operetta.

As the film closes in the early hours at the party at the hotel Falke points the message to the representatives of the four powers, while thanking them for their presence: "even the dearest friend loses his attraction if he overstays.... so if you don't mind, go home, please go home"; at which the waltz "Brüderlein, Brüderlein und Schwesterlein"/"Brothers, brothers and sisters" ('Be my friend') starts up.

Plot
In 1955 Vienna, during its post-war occupation, the black-market dealer Dr. Falke (Anton Walbrook) moves freely through the French, British, American and Russian sectors, dealing in champagne and caviar amongst the highest echelons of the allied powers. After a costume party, French Colonel Gabriel Eisenstein (Michael Redgrave) plays a practical joke on a drunken Falke, depositing him, asleep and dressed as a bat, in the lap of a patriotic Russian statue, to be discovered the following morning by irate Russian soldiers. Falke is nearly arrested until his friend General Orlofsky (Anthony Quayle) of the USSR intervenes. A vengeful Falke plans an elaborate practical joke on his friend, involving Orlofsky, a British Major Frank (Dennis Price) who is sent to escort the French colonel to jail for his misdemeanor, Eisenstein's beautiful wife Rosalinda (Ludmilla Tchérina), her maid Adele (Anneliese Rothenberger) and a masked ball where no one is what they seem. Complicating matters is American Captain Alfred Westerman (Mel Ferrer), an old flame of Rosalinda's who is determined to take advantage of her husband's absence, deliberately taking the hotel room next to hers. When Maj. Frank, arriving to take Col. Eisenstein into custody, catches Alfred in Rosalinda's room, in Eisenstein's dressing gown, Frank takes Alfred for Eisenstein and arrests him (Alfred) instead. To avoid scandal, Alfred does nothing to disabuse Frank of his error.
Later that evening, at the masked ball hosted by Orlofsky, Adele, wearing one of her mistress's gowns, is spotted by Eisenstein, who is unable to do anything about it (as he is supposed already to be in jail and is attending the ball only with the connivance of Orlofsky, at Falke's instigation) and she catches the eye of both Orlofsky and Frank. When the masked Rosalinda arrives, Eisenstein pursues her but she flees with his watch – which Falke slyly tells him will reappear again at his home. At midnight, Eisenstein presents himself at the jail but when he finds Alfred there, still in his (Eisenstein's) dressing gown, he (Eisenstein) realizes that Alfred must have been courting Rosalinda at their hotel, so he rushes back there to confront her, followed by Alfred and Frank, the mistaken identity having been uncovered. She retorts by showing him the watch he had given her at the ball and he begs forgiveness. All this is overhead by the rest of Orlovsky's party guests (who have all found their way back to the hotel) and Falke admits that he was behind the charade. As all sing and dance, Alfred allows himself to be re-arrested in Eisenstein's place.

Cast

Cast notes:
Among the ladies, gentlemen and dancers of the cast were John Schlesinger, Peter Darrell, Joyce Blair and Jill Ireland. On some websites Roy Kinnear is listed in the cast, no role specified, but not on the BFI Screenonline page.

Production
Oh... Rosalinda was filmed at Elstree Studios in Borehamwood, Hertfordshire, and on location in London.

Powell and Pressburger had suffered through four box office disappointments in a row before this film, which is one reason that Bing Crosby, Maurice Chevalier and Orson Welles were approached about playing the roles of Alfred, Eisenstein and Orlovsky – however Oh... Rosalinda!! was not commercially successful. Arundell had already worked with Powell and Pressburger, providing a translation for the film The Tales of Hoffmann. A reviewer of the 2019 Network British Film DVD restoration however notes Heckroth's “stagey expressionism”, “dazzling cinematography aplenty”, and suggests that it prefigures “political operetta deconstructions” of more recent years.

Several of the singing cast would later appear on stage and record in the original piece; Rothenberger and Barabás together sang in excerpts from the operetta for Electrola around the time of the film, and Rothenberger made further full recordings under Hollreiser (1960), Danon (1964) and Boskovsky (1971), for the latter switching to Rosalinde. Walter Berry made five recordings of Fledermaus - singing Frank (1959, 1964, 1971) and Falke (1960, video 1980).

A record of musical excerpts derived from the soundtrack of the film was issued on Nixa LP NLP 18001.

A restoration from the 35mm CinemaScope original camera negative was undertaken prior to a Blu-ray and DVD re-issue in 2019; this included automated and manual dirt and damage removal and correction of instability, warping and density fluctuation.

References
Notes

Further reading
  Reviews and articles at a website devoted to Powell & Pressburger.
  Sympathetic review of Oh... Rosalinda!! in the context of all films by Powell and Pressburger.

External links
 
 
 
 . Full synopsis and film stills (and clips viewable from UK libraries).

1955 musical comedy films
1955 films
West German films
Films shot at Associated British Studios
1950s English-language films
Films based on operettas
Operetta films
Films by Powell and Pressburger
Films set in Vienna
British musical comedy films
German musical comedy films
CinemaScope films
1950s British films
1950s German films